is a railway station on the Keio Inokashira Line in Suginami, Tokyo, Japan, operated by the private railway operator Keio Corporation.

Lines

Service pattern
Only all-stations "Local" services stop at this station. During the daytime, there are eight services per hour in either direction.

Station layout

The station consists of a single ground-level island platform serving two tracks.

Across the tracks at both the Kichijoji and Shibuya ends are pedestrian crossings.
The ticket gates are at ground level, but there is only an entrance on the north side of the tracks. In order to enter the station from the south side, one must first use a pedestrian crossing to the north side.

The station was rebuilt in 1995, moving the station building underground, and extending the length of the platform, coinciding with the introduction of the Keio 1000 series, with trains of five 20 m cars. Before the rebuilding, there was a road crossing the tracks within the area that trains stopped in at the station.

Platforms

History
The station opened on 1 August 1933.

From 22 February 2013, station numbering was introduced on Keio lines, with Hamadayama Station becoming "IN11".

Passenger statistics
In fiscal 2011, the station was used by an average of 28,169 passengers daily.

The passenger figures for previous years are as shown below.

Surrounding area
 
 

As of February 2016, there was a large number of supermarkets near the station compared to other stations on the Inokashira Line, including Comodi Iida, My Basket, Seiyu, and Seijo Ishii.

References

External links

 Hamadayama Station information (Keio) 

Railway stations in Tokyo
Railway stations in Japan opened in 1933